After Glow is a 1957 album by jazz singer Carmen McRae released on Decca Records, her fifth on that label. Recorded in two studio sessions with just a rhythm section, McRae herself alternates on piano with Ronnell Bright on the first date; on April 18 Ray Bryant plays piano.

Track listing
 "I Can't Escape from You" (Leo Robin, Richard Whiting) - 3:35              
 "Guess Who I Saw Today" (Murray Grand, Elisse Boyd) - 3:35
 "My Funny Valentine" (Richard Rodgers, Lorenz Hart) - 3:35
 "It's the Little Things That Mean So Much" (Harold Adamson, Teddy Wilson) - 3:18
 "I'm Thru with Love" (Matty Malneck, Fud Livingston, Gus Kahn) - 4:09
 "Nice Work If You Can Get It" (George Gershwin, Ira Gershwin) - 2:33
 "East of the Sun (and West of the Moon)" (Brooks Bowman) - 2:15
 "Exactly Like You" (Jimmy McHugh, Dorothy Fields) - 2:09
 "All My Life" (Sam H. Stept, Sidney Mitchell) - 4:19
 "Between the Devil and the Deep Blue Sea" (Harold Arlen, Ted Koehler) - 2:30
 "Dream of Life" (Luther Henderson Jr., Carmen McRae) - 4:00
 "Perdido" (Juan Tizol, Hans Lengsfelder, Ervin Drake) - 2:15

Personnel
Carmen McRae – vocals, piano on tracks 1, 4, 8 and 12 (session of March 6, 1957)
Ronnell Bright – piano on 2, 3, 7 and 11 (March 6, 1957)
Ray Bryant – piano on 5, 6, 9 and 10 (April 18, 1957)
Ike Isaacs – double bass
Specs Wright – drums

References

1957 albums
Carmen McRae albums
Decca Records albums